Zoë Sedney (born 15 December 2001) is a Dutch athlete who competes in the hurdles, 100 metres, 200 metres and 4 x 100 metres relay. Sedney's succes started in 2015 at the European Youth Olympic Festival. She broke through at senior level in 2021 competing in both the European Indoor Championships and the Olympic Games. In 2022 she became part of the 4x100 metres Dutch relay team, competing together with her older sister Naomi Sedney.

Career
At the age of five Sedney joined track and field club ARV Ilion in Zoetermeer. Until the age of 14 she combined athletics with playing field hockey at hockey club MHCZ in Zoetermeer. At the age of 15 Sedney decided to solely focus on athletics, a decision which paid off with qualifications on four individual disciplines (100 metres, 200 metres, 400 metres and 100 metres hurdles) at the European Youth Olympic Festival in Győr, Hungary. Sedney ended up competing in the 200 metres and 100 metres hurdles, winning gold in both disciplines. At the same competition she also competed with the Dutch Relay team (Sedney, Minke Bisschops, Suzanne Libbers and Anna Roelofs), winning silver in the 4 x 100 Metres Relay.

In 2018, Sedney went back to Győr, this time to compete in European U18 Championships. Sedney competed in the 100 metres hurdles, winning silver in 13.34.

In 2019, Sedney dealt with a hamstring injury, complicating her preparations for the European U20 Championships in Boras, Sweden. Sedney ended up competing in the 200 metres where she ended up in 10th place and in the 4 x 100 Metres Relay where she won silver with the Dutch relay team (Bisschops, Sedney, Demi van den Wildenberg and N'ketia Seedo).

2020 was the last year Sedney competed as a junior, she ended her junior career with 3 junior national titles in the 100 metres hurdles, 100 metres and 200 metres. She was called "the uncrowned queen of the national junior championships", becoming Junior National Champion 20 times and winning silver three times and bronze twice during her time as a junior.

In 2021, Sedney competed in her first international senior competition at the European Indoor Championships in Toruń, Poland. There she made it to the finals of the 60 metres hurdles and finished in 7th place in 8.00. In the summer of 2021 Sedney competed in the 100 metres hurdles in both the European U23 Championships in Tallinn, Estonia and her first Olympic Games in Tokyo, Japan. In the European U23 Championships Sedney finished 4th in 13.14. In her first Olympic Games Sedney finished 7th in her heat in 13.03. This was not enough for a place in the semi finals as Sedney needed a time of 13.00 to go through to the next round. Sedney had the 24th time overall in the heats.

Sedney had a good start to 2022, winning races at the World Athletics Indoor Tour in Birmingham and Madrid, and becoming national indoor champion on the 60m hurdles. In March Sedney represented the Netherlands in the World Indoor Championships in Belgrade, Serbia. She placed for the finals after winning her semi-final in 7.95. In the finals Sedney finished 6th in 8.07.

International competitions

Personal bests
Outdoor
100 metres hurdles – 12.83 (+1.5 m/s, La Chaux-de-Fonds 2021)
100 metres – 11.30 (+0.8 m/s, Apeldoorn 2022)
200 metres – 23.63 (-0.1 m/s, Alphen aan de Rijn 2019)
Indoor
60 metres hurdles – 7.95 (Madrid 2022)
60 metres – 7.34 (Apeldoorn 2023)
200 metres – 23.71 (Apeldoorn 2019)

References

External links
Zoë Sedney - de beloften
 

2001 births
Living people
Dutch female hurdlers
People from Zoetermeer
World Athletics Championships athletes for the Netherlands
Athletes (track and field) at the 2020 Summer Olympics
Olympic athletes of the Netherlands
Olympic female hurdlers
Sportspeople from South Holland
21st-century Dutch women